Ambodisakoana is a town and commune in Madagascar. It belongs to the district of  Boriziny, which is a part of Sofia Region. The population of the commune was estimated to be approximately 13,000 in 2001 commune census.

Ambodisakoana has a riverine harbour. Only primary schooling is available. The majority 95% of the population of the commune are farmers, while an additional 4.5% receives their livelihood from raising livestock. The most important crop is tobacco, while other important products are cotton, cassava and rice.  Additionally fishing employs 0.5% of the population.

References and notes 

Populated places in Sofia Region